Jann may refer to:

People

Feminine given name
 Jann Arden (born 1962), Canadian singer-songwriter
 Jann Arden (album), her eponymous eighth album
 Jann Browne (born 1954), American country singer
 Jann Carl (born 1960), American journalist
 Jann Sonya McFarlane (born 1944), Australian politician
 Jann Haworth (born 1942), American pop artist
 Jann Knijnenburg (1938–2010), Australian stage actor, model and matriarch of a theatrical family
 Jann Stuckey (born 1955), Australian politician

Masculine given name
 Jann Hoffmann (born 1957), Danish darts player
 Jann Jensen (born 1969), Danish football coach and former player
 Jann Klose, German-born pop singer-songwriter
 Jann Ingi Petersen (born 1984), Faroese footballer
 Jann Sjursen (born 1963), Danish politician
 Jann Wenner (born 1946), co-founder and publisher of Rolling Stone
 Jann Wilde (born 1982), Finnish singer-songwriter
 Jann (born 1999), Polish singer-songwriter

Surname
 Mario Jann (born 1980), German ice hockey player
 Michael Patrick Jann (born 1970), American actor, writer and director
 Peter Jann (born 1935), Austrian jurist

Other uses
 Jann (cards), in some card games, to lose without taking a trick or scoring a minimum number of points
 Jann (legendary creature), a kind of genie
 Jann (TV series), a sitcom produced in Canada
 Jann of the Jungle, comic book girl protagonist in the anthology title Jungle Tales (1954)
 Beit Jann, a village in northern Israel

See also
 
 Jaan (given name)
 Jahn
 Jan (disambiguation)
 Ján
 John (given name)
 Yann